Supissara Paewsampran (born 18 November 1999) is a Thai badminton affiliated with SCG academy. Paewsampran was part of Thailand's bronze medals-winning team at the 2020 Uber Cup.

Achievements

BWF International Challenge/Series (4 titles, 1 runner-up) 
Women's doubles

Mixed doubles

  BWF International Challenge tournament
  BWF International Series tournament
  BWF Future Series tournament

References

External links 
 
 

1999 births
Living people
Supissara Paewsampran
Supissara Paewsampran